Calathus extensicollis is a species of ground beetle from the Platyninae subfamily that is endemic to the island of Pico, Azores. It is presumably extinct, as the last recorded individual dates from 1859.

References

extensicollis
Beetles described in 1873
Endemic arthropods of the Azores
Beetles of Europe